Radbod (or Ratbod) (died 915) was the Archbishop of Trier from 883 until his death. Under the last Carolingians he obtained a great deal of benefits and converted the archdiocese of Trier into one of the most powerful institutions in Germany.

In 898, Radbod received complete immunity from all taxes for the entire episcopal territory from Zwentibold. He obtained from Louis the Child the district and city of Trier, as well as the right to have a mint and impose customs duties. From Charles the Simple he gained the right of free election for his diocese of Trier. In this way the secular possessions of the bishops of Trier, which had sprung from the valuable donations of the Merovingian, were raised to a secular principality

Sources

Bernhardt, John W. Itinerant Kingship and Royal Monasteries in Early Medieval Germany, c. 936–1075. Cambridge: Cambridge University Press, 1993.

915 deaths
Archbishops of Trier
Year of birth unknown